DD Chandigarh is a TV channel owned and operated by Prasar Bharati under Doordarshan, supported by Doordarshan studios in Chandigarh.  Launched in 1996 DD Chandigarh has entertainment serials, infotainment programmes, news and current affairs, social programmes and film programmes as its major content. In terrestrial mode, DD Chandigarh is available to 61.7% of the population of Chandigarh. Transmission of programs mainly in Hindi and Punjabi language for one hour a day i. e from 4:00 pm to 5:00 pm including 10 minutes of news on DD Punjabi.

See also
 List of programs broadcast by DD National
 All India Radio
 Ministry of Information and Broadcasting
 DD Direct Plus
 List of South Asian television channels by country

External links 
 Doordarshan Official Internet site
 Doordarshan news site
 An article at PFC

Kannada-language television channels
Doordarshan
Foreign television channels broadcasting in the United Kingdom
Television channels and stations established in 1991
Direct broadcast satellite services
Indian direct broadcast satellite services
1991 establishments in Chandigarh